The Gum catalog is an astronomical catalog of 84 emission nebulae in the southern sky. It was made by the Australian astronomer  Colin Stanley Gum (1924-1960) at Mount Stromlo Observatory using wide field photography.  Gum published his findings in 1955 in a study entitled A study of diffuse southern H-alpha nebulae which presented a catalog of 84 nebulae or nebular complexes. Similar catalogs include the Sharpless catalog and the RCW catalog, and many of the Gum objects are repeated in these other catalogs. However, the RCW and Gum catalogs were mainly of the southern hemisphere (Mount Stromlo is in the southern hemisphere)

The Gum Nebula is named for Gum, who discovered it as Gum 12; it is an emission nebula that can be found in the southern constellations Vela and Puppis.

Examples

List

Gum 1
Gum 2
Gum 3
Gum 4
Gum 5
Gum 6
Gum 7
Gum 8
Gum 9
Gum 10
Gum 12
Gum 13
Gum 14
Gum 15
Gum 16
Gum 17
Gum 18
Gum 19
Gum 20
Gum 21
Gum 22
Gum 23
Gum 24
Gum 25
Gum 26
Gum 27
Gum 28
Gum 29
Gum 30
Gum 31
Gum 32
Gum 33
Gum 34
Gum 35
Gum 36
Gum 37
Gum 38
Gum 39
Gum 40
Gum 41
Gum 42
Gum 43
Gum 44
Gum 45
Gum 46
Gum 47
Gum 48
Gum 49
Gum 50
Gum 51
Gum 52
Gum 53
Gum 54
Gum 55
Gum 56
Gum 57
Gum 58
Gum 59
Gum 60
Gum 61
Gum 62
Gum 63
Gum 64
Gum 65
Gum 66
Gum 67
Gum 68
Gum 69
Gum 70a, Gum 70b, HD 100546 Nebulae
Gum 71
Gum 72
Gum 73
Gum 74
Gum 75
Gum 76
Gum 77
Gum 78
Gum 79
Gum 80
Gum 81
Gum 82
Gum 83
Gum 84
Gum 85

See also
 RCW Catalogue

References

Sources
Gum Nebula
SouthernSkyPhoto.com
Anglo-Australian Observatory
Physics Today, 2001
The Cloud Hunters
Illustrated Gum Catalog

External links
Illustrated and annotated commentary of Gum objects

Astronomical catalogues of nebulae
H II regions
1955 documents
1955 in science